"Do You Realize??" is a song by the Flaming Lips, released as the first single from their 2002 album Yoshimi Battles the Pink Robots. It is widely considered to be one of the group's most accessible and popular songs. It reached No. 32 in the UK Singles Chart and was adopted as the Official Rock Song of Oklahoma from 2009 to April 2013. The song was ranked No. 31 on Rolling Stone's 100 Best Songs of the 2000s. It is also the band's most popular live song, and has rarely been excluded from setlists since its inception into their live shows in 2002. Wayne Coyne also considers it to be the best song they've ever written.

Structure and recording

In an interview with Mojo, Coyne revealed that during the recording of Yoshimi..., band member Steven Drozd was trying to kick a heroin addiction. When they took breaks from playing, Drozd would have a really tough time with his withdrawal.  Listening to him cry, and with the death of his father in mind, Coyne wrote: "Do You Realize??".

Wayne Coyne, commenting on "Do You Realize??" said, "Whenever I analyze the scientific realities of what it means to be living here on Earth – in this galaxy – spinning around the sun – flying through space – a terror shock seizes me!!! I'm reminded once again of how precarious our whole existence is..."

UK track listing
7"
"Do You Realize??"
"Up Above the Daily Hum"
CD1
"Do You Realize??"
"If I Go Mad/Funeral in My Head"
"Syrtis Major"
CD2
"Do You Realize??"
"Up Above the Daily Hum"
"Xanthe Terra"
DVD single
 "Do You Realize??" (video)
 "Do You Realize??" (audio)
 "The Southern Oklahoma Trigger Contest"
 "Noodling Theme (Epic Sunset Mix #5)"

"Syrtis Major" and "Xanthe Terra" are instrumental pieces intended to be taken from the forthcoming Christmas on Mars soundtrack.

Video
The music video was recorded on Fremont Street in Las Vegas and features Wayne Coyne, people dressed as bunnies and pigs, four female dancers in negligee and a live elephant.  No other members of the band are seen.

Oklahoma state song
In March 2009 "Do You Realize??" was announced as the official state rock song of Oklahoma, after winning an online vote among ten finalists as authorized by the Oklahoma state legislature: out of 21,000 votes cast, nearly 51% were for "Do You Realize??" The Oklahoma Senate approved this choice unanimously.  However, on 23 April 2009, a vote in the Oklahoma House of Representatives fell three votes short of the 51 votes necessary to ratify the resolution: one Republican state legislator attacked the band for its use of offensive language, while another said he opposed the song because band member Michael Ivins had worn a red T-shirt with a yellow sickle and hammer during a previous appearance by the band. Democratic Governor Brad Henry subsequently announced that he would issue an executive order in lieu of the resolution rejected by the Oklahoma House. However, it was revealed in 2013 that Republican Governor Mary Fallin removed the song's designation as the Official Rock Song of Oklahoma by not renewing Brad Henry's executive order upon taking office in 2011.

Commercial appearances

Hewlett-Packard featured the band alongside Penn and Teller in its 2002 commercial for its HP Media Center PC, which included a clip of the music video. In a review of the ad, music journalist Jim DeRogatis said, "It was a commercial for the Flaming Lips," as much as it was for HP's computer.

In 2003, VH1 featured the song in spot that promoted its network. In 2004, Mitsubishi used the song in a television ad for one of its cars, as did Land Rover in 2007 with voice-over by Charles Shaughnessy.

A cover version was used in the teaser trailer of Transformers: The Last Knight in late 2016.

The song was used in the trailer for Guardians of the Galaxy Vol. 3 shown at San Diego Comic-Con in July 2022.

Covers
The song was covered by The Reign of Kindo on their eponymous debut album. It was also covered in 2012 by Ball Park Music for Australian radio station Triple J's Like a Version.

Father John Misty, American folk singer-songwriter and former member of indie rock bands Saxon Shore and Fleet Foxes, performed a version of the song in July 2012 for The A.V. Club A.V. Undercover series. Father John Misty's version is featured in the 2022 film Press Play.

American Jewish rock band Blue Fringe covered the song on their 2007 album The Whole World Lit Up.

In 2015, the song was covered by British singer/composer Ursine Vulpine (aka Frederick Lloyd). This version was used for the first theatrical trailer of Transformers: The Last Knight as well as the trailer for the third season of the television series Penny Dreadful) 
In 2016, Sharon Van Etten covered the song for Amazon's Gortimer Gibbon's Life on Normal Street soundtrack.

Chart positions

Certifications

References

External links
[ Song review] from Allmusic

2002 singles
The Flaming Lips songs
Oklahoma
Songs about death
Symbols of Oklahoma
Warner Records singles
Music videos directed by Mark Pellington
Music of Oklahoma
Songs written by Wayne Coyne
Songs written by Michael Ivins
Songs written by Steven Drozd
2002 songs